Jean-Étienne-Auguste Massol (also known as Eugène Massol) (23 August 1802 – 30 October 1887) was a French operatic tenor and later baritone who sang in the world premieres of many French operas.

Massol was born in Lodève and trained at the Paris Conservatory under Charles-Henri Plantade. He won the conservatory's first prize in singing in 1825 and that same year made his stage debut as Licinius in Spontini's La vestale at the Paris Opera. He sang primarily secondary tenor roles until the late 1830s when he increasingly gravitated to baritone roles. In 1845 he went to Brussels where he sang leading baritone roles including the title role of Nabucco in its first performance at the Théâtre Royal de la Monnaie and went on to serve as the theatre's director from 1848 to 1849. During that period he also sang in London with the Royal Italian Opera at Covent Garden. In 1850 he returned to the Paris Opera and remained there as a principal baritone until his retirement from the stage in 1858. Massol died in Paris at the age of 85.

Roles created
Lorenzo (tenor) in La muette de Portici, 1828
Second knight (tenor) in Le comte Ory, 1828
Rodolphe (tenor) in Guillaume Tell, 1829
Herald (tenor) in Robert le diable, 1831
Christian (tenor) in Gustave III, 1833
First drinker (tenor) in La Juive, 1835
Cossé (tenor) in Les Huguenots, 1836
Quasimodo (tenor) in La Esmeralda, 1836
Michael (tenor) in Stradella, 1837
Fortebraccio (tenor) in Guido et Ginevra, 1838
Fieramosca (baritone) in Benvenuto Cellini, 1838
Sévère (baritone) in Les Martyrs, 1840
Bronzino (baritone) in Le comte de Carmagnola, 1841
Mocénigo (baritone) in La reine de Chypre, 1841
L'Inconnu (baritone?) in Le guérilléro, 1842
L'homme de la forêt du Mans (tenor) in Charles VI, 1843
Abayaldos (baritone) in Dom Sébastien, 1843
Ruben (baritone) in L'enfant prodigue, 1850
Ahasvérus (baritone) in Le Juif errant, 1852

References
Notes

Sources

Kuhn, Laura (ed.) (2000). "Massol, Eugène Étienne Auguste", Baker's Dictionary of Opera, Schirmer Books, p. 499. 
Meyerbeer, Giacomo (2001). The Diaries of Giacomo Meyerbeer: 1840-1849, translated, edited and annotated by Robert Ignatius Letellier. Associated University Presse. 

1802 births
1887 deaths
French operatic tenors
French operatic baritones
19th-century French male opera singers